One-X is the second studio album by Canadian rock band Three Days Grace. It was produced by Howard Benson and is the band's first album recorded as a four-piece band, as Barry Stock joined the group and took over lead guitar from lead singer Adam Gontier. It is their first and only album under Sony BMG, the successor to Sony Music Entertainment's original roots and Bertelsmann Music Group. The Sony BMG joint venture was dropped in 2008, which led to Bertelsmann's Sony BMG stake going back to Sony.

One-X was released on June 13, 2006. The album was both a critical and financial success, being certified silver in the United Kingdom and triple-platinum in both the U.S. and Canada.

Pre-release and writing
Before One-X was released, the band previewed some numbers from the upcoming album on several occasions. They played four of these new songs, including "Animal I Have Become" and "Never Too Late", at the H.O.P.E. Volleyball SummerFest in Ottawa during July of 2005. The band began recording the album in the winter of 2005. "Animal I Have Become" was released as a single and received substantial airplay before it was released with One-X.

Previews for four of the tracks on One-X were able to be found on Three Days Grace's Online Trading Cards. Tracks that could be previewed were "It's All Over", "Pain", "Never Too Late" and "Over and Over".
 
Adam Gontier wrote many of these songs during rehabilitation after being addicted to OxyContin (oxycodone), a pain killer. "Usually we all sit as a group, hanging out, working together, but here I was just alone, writing about how I felt," as Adam Gontier said in his docu-drama about his experience, Behind The Pain. Gontier has also said that the album was a lot more personal to him than their previous record. Guitarist Barry Stock said that One-X is about, "feeling like a target, like you're standing alone in a crowd of people."

The album cover depicts a string of connected paper dolls with checkmarks on all with the exception of one which is crossed out, thus One X. On the inside, the CD tray shows all red fish, except one black fish. This same image is also on the "Animal I Have Become" single cover. The lyrics are included in the album booklet.

Promotion
To support the album, Three Days Grace headlined the "One-X Tour" that began in June 2006 with support from Staind. The group also performed in Japan and Australia in 2007. The band continued the tour in 2008 performing in the US with supporting acts from Breaking Benjamin and Seether. The band also co-headlined a North American fall tour with Breaking Benjamin in 2007. They supported Nickelback on the "All the Right Reasons Tour" in February 2007.

Sales
The album debuted at No. 2 on the Canadian Albums Chart selling just under 19,000 copies in its first week. The album also entered the Billboard 200 albums chart at No. 5 with first week sales of more than 78,000 copies. The album has sold over 1.2 million copies in the US and 158,000 units in Canada.

Reception

One-X was met with positive reviews. The Toronto Star complimented the album with a review title of "One CD worth buying..." and focused on its lyrics, saying, "The lyrics really speak out to you, especially if you're going through a tough time in your life." AllMusic reviewer Corey Apar praised the music, saying it "remains catchy despite its lyrical darkness". Kaj Roth at Melodic criticized the predictability of the album, stating "Three Days Grace has lost their soul, their debut was a lot better!" Roth, however, praised the songs "Animal I Have Become" and "Pain".

Accolades
In 2007, One-X earned the band an award for Rock Artist of the Year by Billboard magazine. The album also earned a Juno Award nomination in 2007 for "Album of the Year". They won a Media Base award for most played rock song on radio in Canada for their single "Animal I Have Become". One-X has been certified triple platinum in both Canada and in the US, respectively. All four of the album's singles as of February 2018 have gone platinum with "Animal I Have Become" and "Never Too Late" being multi-platinum. In addition, "Time of Dying", was certified gold in the same month.

Track listing
Credits adapted from the album's liner notes.

Personnel

Three Days Grace
 Adam Gontier – lead vocals, rhythm guitar
 Neil Sanderson – drums, backing vocals
 Brad Walst – bass guitar, backing vocals
 Barry Stock – lead guitar

Additional musicians
 Ned Brower – background vocals on "Animal I Have Become" and "One-X"
 Taylor Locke – background vocals on "One-X"
 Deborah Lurie – string arrangements on "Over and Over" (recorded at Fire House Studios, Brooklyn, New York, New York)
 Casey Stone – string engineering

Production
 Howard Benson – producer, keyboards and programming
 Mike Plotnikoff – recording
 Hatsukazu Inagaki – assistant engineer
 Paul DeCarli – Pro Tools editing, additional programming, programming on "Time of Dying"
 Chris Lord-Alge – mixing at Resonate Music, Burbank, CA
 Gersh (Drum Fetish) – drum technician
 Marc VanGool – guitar tech
 Ted Jensen – mastering at Sterling Sound, New York, NY

Artwork
 Brian Kushner – editor for the enhanced portion
 Purple Can Post – facility
 Three Days Grace – art direction and design
 Warless Rabit – art direction and design
 Jackie Murphy – art direction and design
 Jeff Gilligan – art direction and design
 Dean Karr – photography

Charts

Weekly charts

Year-end charts

Certifications

References

2006 albums
Albums produced by Howard Benson
Jive Records albums
Three Days Grace albums